Medieval India refers to a long period of post-classical history of the Indian subcontinent between the "ancient period" and "modern period". It is usually regarded as running approximately from the breakup of the Gupta Empire in the 6th century CE to the start of the early modern period in 1526 with the start of the Mughal Empire, although some historians regard it as both starting and finishing later than these points. The medieval period is itself subdivided into the early medieval and late medieval eras.

In the early medieval period, there were more than 40 different states on the Indian subcontinent, which hosted a variety of cultures, languages, writing systems, and religions. At the beginning of the time Pala Empire was predominant but short-lived  on the Indo Gangetic Plain sponsoring the institutions. One such institution was the Nalanda University in modern-day Bihar, India, a centre of scholarship and brought a divided South Asia onto the global intellectual stage. Another accomplishment was the invention of the Chaturanga game which later was exported to Europe and became Chess.
In Southern India, the Hindu Kingdom of Chola gained prominence with an overseas empire that controlled parts of modern-day Sri Lanka, Malaysia, and Indonesia as oversees territories, and helped spread Hinduism into the historic cultural area of Southeast Asia. In this time period, neighboring  regions such as Afghanistan, Tibet, and Southeast Asia were under South Asian influence.

The late medieval period was marked by an era of Muslim dominance as a result of a series of conquests. This led to the establishment of Delhi Sultanate in Northern India, which ruled until the 16th century. As a consequence, Buddhism declined in South Asia, but Hinduism survived and reinforced itself in areas conquered by Muslim empires. In the far South, the Vijayanagara Empire resisted Muslim conquests, sparking a long rivalry with the Bahmani Sultanate. The turn of the 16th century would see the introduction of gunpowder and the rise of a new Muslim empire—the Mughals, as well as the establishment of European trade posts by the Portuguese colonists. Mughal Empire was one of the three Islamic gunpowder empires, along with the Ottoman Empire and Safavid Persia. The subsequent cultural and technological developments transformed Indian society, concluding the late medieval period and beginning the Early modern period.

Terminology and periodization
One definition includes the period from the 6th century, the first half of the 7th century, or the 8th century up to the 16th century, essentially coinciding with the Middle Ages of Europe. It may be divided into two periods: The 'early medieval period' which lasted from the 6th to the 13th century and the 'late medieval period' which lasted from the 13th to the 16th century, ending with the start of the Mughal Empire in 1526. The Mughal era, from the 16th century to the 18th century, is often referred to as the early modern period, but is sometimes also included in the 'late medieval' period.

An alternative definition, often seen in those more recent authors who still use the term at all, brings the start of the medieval times forward, either to about 1000 CE, or to the 12th century. The end may be pushed back to the 18th century, Hence, this period can be effectively considered as the beginning of Muslim domination to British India. Or the "early medieval" period as beginning in the 8th century, and ending with the 11th century.

The use of "medieval" at all as a term for periods in Indian history has often been objected to, and is probably becoming more rare (there is a similar discussion in terms of the history of China). It is argued that neither the start nor the end of the period really mark fundamental changes in Indian history, comparable to the European equivalents. Burton Stein still used the concept in his A History of India (1998), referring to the period from the Guptas to the Mughals, but most recent authors using it are Indian. Understandably, they often specify the period they cover within their titles.

Periods

Early medieval period

The start of the period is typically taken to be the slow collapse of the Gupta Empire from about 480 to 550, ending the "classical" period, as well as "ancient India", although both these terms may be used for periods with widely different dates, especially in specialized fields such as the history of art or religion.  Another alternative for the preceding period is "Early Historical" stretching "from the sixth century BC to the sixth century AD", according to Romila Thapar.

At least in northern India, there was no larger state until the Delhi Sultanate, or certainly the Mughal Empire, but there were several different dynasties ruling large areas for long periods, as well as many other dynasties ruling smaller areas, often paying some form of tribute to larger states. John Keay puts the typical number of dynasties within the subcontinent at any one time at between 20 and 40, not including local rajas. 
Pallava dynasty, rulers of Telugu and some Tamil areas from the 3rd to 9th centuries.
Empire of Harsha, a brief period of control of most of north India, from 601 to 647, under Harsha of the Vardhana dynasty.
Gurjara-Pratihara dynasty, was the last largest dynasty of northern India which rivaled the Gupta empire in extent and ruled a large swath of northern India from the 6th century to 11th century. They can be differentiated from other kingdoms as they were called Imperial Pratiharas.
Chalukya dynasty ruled most of the western Deccan and some parts of South India, between the 6th to 12th centuries. Kannada-speaking, with capital at Badami.
Rashtrakuta dynasty, was a Kannada dynasty ruling large parts of the Indian subcontinent between the 6th and the 10th centuries and built the World Heritage site of Ellora, Maharashtra.
Eastern Chalukyas, 7th and 12th centuries, a South Indian Kannada-Telugu dynasty whose kingdom was located in present-day Andhra Pradesh, they were the descendants of Western Chalukyas.
Pala Empire, the last major Buddhist rulers, from the 8th to 12th centuries in Bengal. Briefly controlled most of north India in the 9th century.
Chola Empire, a South Indian empire which ruled from Tamil Nadu and extended to include Southeast Asian territories at its height. Ruled from the 9th century to 13th century.
Western Chalukya Empire, ruled most of the western Deccan and some of South India, between the 10th to 12th centuries. Kannada-speaking, with capital at Badami.
Kalachuri dynasty, ruled areas in Central India during 10th-12th centuries.
Nagvanshis of Chotanagpur, ruled Chotanagpur plateau in Jharkhand.
Western Ganga dynasty, was an important ruling dynasty of ancient Karnataka, often under the overlordship of larger states, from about 350 to 1000 CE. The large monolithic Bahubali of Shravanabelagola was built during their rule.
Eastern Ganga dynasty, was a royal dynasty ruling Odisha region who are descendants of Kannada Western Ganga Dynasty and Tamil Chola Empire. They have built famous Konark Sun Temple and Jagannath Temple, Puri.
Hoysala Empire, a prominent South Indian Kannadiga empire that ruled most of the modern day state of Karnataka between the 10th and the 14th centuries. The capital of the Hoysalas was initially located at Belur but was later moved to Halebidu.
Kakatiya Kingdom, a Telugu dynasty that ruled most of current day Andhra Pradesh, India from 1083 to 1323 CE.
The Sena dynasty, was a Hindu dynasty that ruled from Bengal through the 11th and 12th centuries. The empire at its peak covered much of the north-eastern region of the Indian subcontinent. The rulers of the Sena Dynasty traced their origin to the south Indian region of Karnataka.
Kamarupa, 4th to 12th century in Assam, ruled by three dynasties viz Varman dynasty, Mlechchha dynasty, Pala dynasty (Kamarupa).

Late medieval period

This period follows the Muslim conquests of the Indian subcontinent and the decline of Buddhism, the eventual founding of the Delhi Sultanate and the creation of Indo-Islamic architecture, followed by the establishment of the Bengal Sultanate.
Bengal Sultanate, 1352 to 1576, ruled over Bengal and much of Burma.
Khandesh Sultanate under Farooqi dynasty, 1382–1601, in the region of Khandesh
Jaunpur Sultanate, 1394–1479, in northern India 
Gujarat Sultanate, 1407–1573, in the state of Gujarat.
Malwa Sultanate, 1392–1562, in the region of Malwa
Bahmani Sultanate, 1347–1527, in the Deccan region.
Madurai Sultanate, 1335–1378, in South India.
Chero dynasty, ruled from the 12th to 18th century, governed over parts of eastern Uttar Pradesh, Bihar and Jharkhand.
Delhi Sultanate, five short-lived dynasties, based in Delhi, from 1206 to 1526, when it fell to the Mughal Empire.
Gajapati Empire, was a medieval Hindu dynasty that ruled between 1434 and 1541 over Kalinga (the present day Odisha).
Nagvanshis of Chotanagpur, ruled Chotanagpur plateau in Jharkhand.
Seuna (Yadava) dynasty, 1190–1315, an old Kannada-Maratha dynasty, which at its peak ruled a kingdom stretching from the Tungabhadra to the Narmada rivers, including present-day Maharashtra, north Karnataka and parts of Madhya Pradesh, from its capital at Devagiri.
Reddy Kingdom, 1325 to 1448, ruled in Andhra Pradesh.
Vijayanagara Empire, 1336–1646, a Hindu-Kannadiga empire based in Karnataka, in the Deccan Plateau region. UNESCO World Heritage Site Hampi in Bellary district of Karnataka was their capital city.

Other prominent kingdoms
Rajput States, were a group of Rajput Hindu states that ruled present-day Rajasthan, and at times much of Madhya Pradesh, Gujarat, Uttaranchal, Himachal Pradesh, Western Uttar Pradesh and Central Uttar Pradesh. Many Rajput kingdoms continued under the Mughals and as Princely States in British India until Indian independence.

Northeast India
Jaintia kingdom, 500–1835, a matrilineal kingdom in present-day Sylhet Division, Bangladesh
Chutia kingdom, 12th century to 1524, in Assam and Arunachal Pradesh, fell to the Ahom kingdom.
Kamata kingdom, established in the middle of 13th century, broke up in 1582 into Koch Bihar (eventually a princely state) and Koch Hajo (eventually absorbed partly by the Mughals and the Ahom kingdom).
Ahom Kingdom, 1228–1826, Brahmaputra valley in Assam, eventually taken by the British.
Dimasa kingdom, 13th century to 1832, in North Cachar Hills and Barak valley in Assam, eventually annexed by the British.
Tripura kingdom, unknown origin, survived as princely state during the British Raj and absorbed into India.
Manipur kingdom, unknown to 1949, princely state during the British Raj and absorbed into India in 1949.

Early modern period
The start of the Mughal Empire in 1526 marked the beginning of the early modern period of Indian history, often referred to as the Mughal era. Sometimes, the Mughal era is also referred  as the 'late medieval' period.

Nayaka dynasties of Kannada, Telugu and Tamil kings that ruled parts of south India after the fall of the Vijayanagara Empire in 1646. Their contribution can be seen in Ikkeri, Sri Ranga, Madurai, and Chitradurga. The earliest of its dynasties date from the early 14th century and the latest in the 19th century.
Kingdom of Mysore, a southern Indian kingdom founded in 1399 in the vicinity of the modern city of Mysore. Fully independent after the fall of the Vijayanagara Empire in 1646, reduced in size by the British, but ruled by the Wadiyars as a princely state until 1947.
Mughal Empire, was an imperial state founded by Babur, who had a Turco-Mongol origin from Central Asia. The empire ruled most of the Indian subcontinent from the 16th to 18th century, though it lingered for another century, formally ending in 1857.
Maratha Empire, 1674–1818, was an imperial power based in modern-day Maharashtra in western India. Marathas replaced the Mughal rule over large parts of India in the 18th century, but lost the Anglo-Maratha Wars in the early 19th century, and became rulers of princely states.
Bharatpur State, was a Jat kingdom that was founded in 1722 around the modern city of Bharatpur. It was founded during the fall of the Mughal Empire, reduced in size by the invaders, but ruled as a princely state until 1947.
Sikh Empire, 1799–1849, was a major power in the Northwestern part of the Indian subcontinent, which arose under the leadership of Maharaja Ranjit Singh in the Punjab region. They were usurped by the British East India Company between the early and mid 19th century, following the British victory in the Second Anglo-Sikh War.

Historiography
Modern historical works written on medieval India have received some criticism from scholars studying the historiography of the period. E. Sreedharan argues that, after Indian independence up until the 1960s, Indian historians were often motivated by Indian nationalism. Peter Hardy notes that the majority of modern historical works on medieval India up until then were written by British and Hindu historians, whereas the work of modern Muslim historians was under-represented. However, he argues that some of the modern Muslim historiography on medieval India at the time was motivated by Islamic apologetics, attempting to justify "the life of medieval Muslims to the modern world."

Ram Sharan Sharma has criticised the simplistic manner in which Indian history is often divided into an ancient "Hindu" period, a medieval "Muslim" period, and a modern "British" period. He argues that there is no clear sharp distinction between when the ancient period ended and when the medieval period began, noting dates ranging from the 7th century to the 13th century.

Notes

References 
Avari, Burjor, India: The Ancient Past: A History of the Indian Subcontinent from C. 7000 BCE to CE 1200, 2016 (2nd edn), Routledge, 9781317236733, google books
 
Farooqui, Salma Ahmed, A Comprehensive History of Medieval India: From Twelfth to the Mid-Eighteenth Century, 2011, Pearson Education India, 9788131732021, google books
Harle, J.C., The Art and Architecture of the Indian Subcontinent, 2nd edn. 1994, Yale University Press Pelican History of Art,  
Keay, John, India: A History, 2000, HarperCollins, 
Michell, George, (1977) The Hindu Temple: An Introduction to its Meaning and Forms, 1977, University of Chicago Press, 
Rowland, Benjamin, The Art and Architecture of India: Buddhist, Hindu, Jain, 1967 (3rd edn.), Pelican History of Art, Penguin,

Further reading
 
 

 Satish Chandra; Historiography, Religion and State in Medieval India, Har-Anand Publications, 2010.
 Elliot and Dowson: The History of India as told by its own Historians, New Delhi reprint, 1990.
 Elliot, Sir H. M., Edited by Dowson, John. The History of India, as Told by Its Own Historians. The Muhammadan Period; published by London Trubner Company 1867–1877. (Online Copy: The History of India, as Told by Its own Historians. The Muhammadan Period; by Sir H. M. Elliot; Edited by John Dowson; London Trubner Company 1867–1877 – This online Copy has been posted by: The Packard Humanities Institute; Persian Texts in Translation; Also find other historical books: Author List and Title List)
 Gommans, Jos J. L. (2002), Mughal Warfare: Indian Frontiers and Highroads to Empire, 1500–1700, Routledge, .
Lal, K. S. (1999). Theory and practice of Muslim state in India. New Delhi: Aditya Prakashan.
 
 
Misra, R. G. (1993). Indian resistance to early Muslim invaders up to 1206 AD. Meerut City: Anu Books.
Sarkar, Jadunath. (1997). Fall of the Mughal Empire: Vol. 1–4. Hyderabad: Orient Longman. 
Sarkar, Jadunath. (1975). Studies in economic life in Mughal India. Delhi: Oriental Publishers & Distributors.; (1987). Mughal economy: Organization and working. Calcutta, India: Naya Prokash. 
Srivastava, A. L. (1970). The Mughal Empire, 1526-1803 A.D. ... Seventh revised edition. Agra: Shiva Lal Agarwala & Co.
Srivastava, A. L. (1975). Medieval Indian culture. Agra: Agarwala.

Wink, André (1996). Al-Hind: The Making of the Indo-Islamic Worlds Vol 1. E. J. Brill. .

Primary sources
Babur, ., & Thackston, W. M. (2002). The Baburnama: Memoirs of Babur, prince and emperor. New York: Modern Library.
Muḥammad, A. K., & Pandit, K. N. (2009). A Muslim missionary in mediaeval Kashmir: Being the English translation of Tohfatu'l-ahbab.
 
Jain, M. The India They Saw : Foreign Accounts (4 Volumes) Delhi: Ocean Books, 2011.

External links
 Online Copy: The History of India, as Told by Its Own Historians. The Muhammadan Period; by Sir H. M. Elliot; Edited by John Dowson; London Trubner Company 1867–1877 – This online Copy has been postesd by: The Packard Humanities Institute; Persian Texts in Translation; Also find other historical books: Author List and Title List